George Frederick Carpenter (28 May 1881 – 13 June 1919) was an Australian rules footballer who played with St Kilda in the Victorian Football League (VFL).	Until his sudden death in 1919 from pneumonia, Carpenter was a member of staff for The Age newspaper.

References

External links 

1881 births
1919 deaths
Australian rules footballers from Victoria (Australia)
St Kilda Football Club players
Deaths from pneumonia in Victoria (Australia)
Deaths from Spanish flu